Extreme Power Metal is the eighth studio album by British power metal band DragonForce, released on 27 September 2019. It is the band's last studio album to feature longtime bassist Frédéric Leclercq and the first not to feature longtime keyboardist Vadim Pruzhanov, who left the band in 2018; Epica keyboardist Coen Janssen recorded keyboards for the album while the band searched for a permanent replacement. The lead single "Highway to Oblivion" was released on 30 July 2019. The band embarked on a world tour in support of the album following its release. Music videos for "Troopers of the Stars" and "Strangers" were filmed, but not released until two years later, on 27 August 2021 and 25 October 2021, respectively. In 2022, the band continued touring the album after their last tour's cancelation due to the COVID-19 pandemic. On 29 November 2022, the music video for "The Last Dragonborn" was released, being the first music video with new bassist Alicia Vigil.

Recording 
The band recorded the album with producer and Once Human's bassist Damien Rainaud at Mix Unlimited in Los Angeles. Part of the recording was also livestreamed on guitarist Herman Li's Twitch.

Track listing 

The Japanese special edition of the album also included a bonus DVD containing professionally recorded footage of the band's performance at Download Festival in 2018.

Personnel
Credits adapted from the band's website.

Band members
 Marc Hudson – lead and backing vocals
 Sam Totman – guitars, backing vocals
 Herman Li – guitars, backing vocals
 Frédéric Leclercq – bass, guitars, backing vocals
 Gee Anzalone – drums, backing vocals
 
Additional musicians
 Coen Janssen – keyboards, piano, orchestration
 Emily Ovenden – backing vocals 
 Clive Nolan – backing vocals 
 Kalen Chase Musmecci – backing vocals
 Steve Francis, Ross Mallon, Josh O'Brien, Paul Roberts, Tim Mekalick – additional backing vocals on "Troopers of the Stars"

Charts

References 

2019 albums
DragonForce albums
Metal Blade Records albums